Anne Ferm (born 26 August 1969) is a Swedish ice hockey player. She represented Team Sweden in the women's tournament at the 1998 Winter Olympics.

References

External links
 

1969 births
Living people
Swedish women's ice hockey players
Olympic ice hockey players of Sweden
Ice hockey players at the 1998 Winter Olympics
People from Kalmar
Sportspeople from Kalmar County